Michael Okpala (August 8, 1939 – March 11, 2004), also known as "Power Mike", was a household name in the world of wrestling as a retired undefeated World Heavyweight wrestling champion.

Early life
Power Mike was born as Michael Okpala on the 8th of August, 1939 to Echeobi and Janet Okpala at Neni, in Anaocha Local Government Area of Anambra State in the eastern part of Nigeria. He was the first born of a family of three

When he reached elementary school age, he was enrolled into the Anglican Primary School at Adazi-Enu, a neighbouring town to Neni. It was at this primary school that he started building his athletic career by being active in sporting events. He was so interested in boxing that he became an amateur boxer.

After finishing primary school in 1952, he left his village for Onitsha, in order to learn how to organise and run a trade business. At Onitsha, he joined the Dick Tiger Boxing Club as a middle weight amateur boxer. It was here that Dick Ihetu Tiger became his role model. On leaving Onitsha, he left for Kano to specialize in the business of buying and selling tyres. During an apprenticeship as a motor mechanic he realized his dream. This realization sparked his rebirth and he acquired a new name, Power Mike.

Power Mike
While in Kano in northern Nigeria, he started a superman show business which made him popular locally. His imaginative exhibitions in Kano virtually cast a spell on people from various social backgrounds because they were yearning to see him perform. Showmanship took him around the world in the mid-1950s. His act included such feats as using his bare hands to bend a six-inch nail, lifting four heavy men with ease, engaging several men in a game of tug-of-war, using bare hands to break a coconut and so on.

In 1961, he started a nationwide tour which took him to Onitsha, Enugu, Aba, Port Harcourt, Lagos, Jos and Kaduna. In 1964, Power Mike went to Ghana and his performances there were a tremendous success. He later toured Cote d'Ivoire and Senegal before he found his way into Europe in 1967, accompanied by his friend Engr. Onyeso, the Igwe of Nri. He got a one-year contract in Sweden after which he went to Greece. It was there that he became a wrestler.

Wrestling
A wrestling promoter saw him performing as a superman in Greece and took interest in him. He was trained by Kalie Abdulkalie of Lebanon. Initially, he did not like the brutality in wrestling. However, he later became an acclaimed wrestler and one of the best that Greece could boast of at the time.

When he left Greece, he went back to Britain to compete, and thus he truly started his career as a wrestler. He came back to Africa in 1970 and in the same year he defeated Gambia's Massambula to become the African heavyweight wrestling champion and titleholder.

He wrestled with and defeated Ali Baba of Lebanon in 1973. Johnny Kwango also became a victim of Power Mike's when he (Mike) defeated him in Lagos. Among the list of wrestlers that Power Mike defeated were Power Jack, Joseph Kovacs, Judd Harris, John Tiger of Canada and a host of other notable worldwide superstars.

Apart from his pro wrestling prowess, he was also a promoter of the sport and his Power Mike International Promotions brought foreign wrestlers like Mil Mascaras, Dick the 'Bulldog Brower', Buddy Rose, Michael Hayes (wrestler), Mighty Igor, The Mongols, Carlos Colon, Chris Adams (wrestler), Thunderbolt Williams and so on to the shores of Nigeria. He retired from active wrestling in 1976 and then focused on international promotions.

Michael Okpala died on 11 March 2004 at the National Hospital, Abuja after a protracted illness.

References

Nigerian male sport wrestlers
2004 deaths
1939 births